Yevgeny  Yakovlevich Sivokon (born May 7, 1937, Kyiv) is a Soviet and Ukrainian director of animated films. Winner of numerous Soviet, Ukrainian and international festivals.

Almost all of the current directors Ukrainian animators were his disciples.

Author of the book  'If You Love Animation' (1985).

Filmography

Director
1966: Fragments
1968: The man who could fly
1970: The Tale of good rhino
1971: Good Name
1971: From start to finish
1973:  Fraction
1973:  
1974: The Tale of the white icicles
1975: Beware - the nerves!
1976: Door
1977: The Adventures Vakula
1979: Sloth
1979: Reshuffle
1980: The secret love potion
1981: Unlucky star
1982: Country schitaliya
1983: Wood and cat
1984: Glance
1985: An unwritten
1987: Window
1989: Why is Uncle Jack limps
1992: Dream Svitla
1999: Yak metelik vivchav Zhittya 
1999:   Yak at nashogo Omelechka nevelichka simeєchka
2002: Kompromiks
2005:    
2008: Vryatyy i zberezhi
2017: Khroniki odnogo mista (based on Mikhail Saltykov-Shchedrin's The History of a Town)

Animator  
 1998:  Father

References

External links
Yevgeny Sivokon on animator.ru
 
 Евгений Сивоконь «В формате 2D»

1937 births
Soviet animation directors
Soviet animators
Ukrainian animators
Russian animated film directors
Ukrainian animated film directors
Living people